Homer Kirk Grantham Sr. (May 2, 1896 – October 28, 1963) was an American football, basketball and baseball player and coach.

Early life
Grantham was a veteran of World War I. He attended Union University in Jackson, Tennessee and West Tennessee Normal School, now known as the University of Memphis.

Coaching career

Memphis
While at West Tennessee Normal, Grantham  served as the school's head men's basketball coach during the 1920–21 season.

UT Martin
During his tenure from 1925 to 1932, Grantham was the head coach football, basketball and baseball at the Hall-Moody Institute, now known as the University of Tennessee at Martin.

References

External links
 

1896 births
1963 deaths
Memphis Tigers baseball players
Memphis Tigers football players
Memphis Tigers men's basketball coaches
Memphis Tigers men's basketball players
Union Bulldogs football players
UT Martin Skyhawks baseball coaches
UT Martin Skyhawks football coaches
UT Martin Skyhawks men's basketball coaches
High school football coaches in Tennessee